A Woman's Revenge is a 2012 Portuguese film directed by Rita Azevedo Gomes.

Cast
 Rita Durão
 Fernando Rodrigues as Roberto

References

External links

Portuguese drama films
Films based on short fiction
Films based on works by Jules Barbey d'Aurevilly
2012 films
2010s Portuguese-language films